Zack Kim Yong Woon or Zack Kim is a Korean guitarist.

Sources
LeOuf, Nikouf: "Zack Kim and the Cosmic Funk Express", Les Cakos du Web, May 8, 2006

South Korean classical guitarists
South Korean rock guitarists
Living people
1983 births
21st-century guitarists